The United States women's national under-19 volleyball team represents the United States in international women's volleyball competitions and friendly matches under the age 18 and it is ruled by the American Volleyball Federation USAV body That is an affiliate of International Volleyball Federation FIVB and also a part of North, Central America and Caribbean Volleyball Confederation NORCECA.

Results

Summer Youth Olympics
 Champions   Runners up   Third place   Fourth place

FIVB U18 World Championship
 Champions   Runners up   Third place   Fourth place

NORCECA Girls U18 Championship
 Champions   Runners up   Third place   Fourth place

Team

Current squad
The following is the American roster in the 2017 FIVB Girls' U18 World Championship.

Head coach: Jim Stone

Notable players

 Micha Hancock
 Megan Hodge
 Rachael Adams
 Jordan Larson
 Nicole Fawcett

References

External links
 www.usavolleyball.org

National women's under-18 volleyball teams
Volleyball in the United States
Volleyball